FDF may refer to:

 Djiboutian Football Federation
 Factoría de Ficción, a Spanish television channel
 Factoría de Ficción (pay television), a defunct Spanish television channel
 Fascist Defence Force, the paramilitary section of the British Union of Fascists (BUF)
 Federal Department of Finance, in Switzerland
 Finnish Defence Forces, Finnish military
 Food and Drink Federation, a British trade association
 Forms Data Format, a file format associated with Portable Document Format (PDF)
 Francophone Democratic Federalists, known earlier as the Democratic Front of Francophones, a political party in Belgium
 Frivilligt Drenge- og Pige-Forbund, a Danish youth organization
 Martinique Aimé Césaire International Airport, on Martinique
Finished dosage form